San Ramón District may refer to:

 Peru
 San Ramón District, Chanchamayo, in Chanchamayo province
 Costa Rica
 San Ramón District, La Unión, in La Unión Canton, Cartago province
 San Ramón District, San Ramón, in San Ramón (canton), Alajuela province